Pterostylis wapstrarum, commonly known as the fleshy greenhood,  is a plant in the orchid family Orchidaceae and is endemic to Tasmania. Both flowering and non-flowering plants have a rosette of leaves lying flat on the ground and flowering plants have up to fifteen crowded green flowers with darker green veins.

Description
Pterostylis wapstrarum, is a terrestrial,  perennial, deciduous, herb with an underground tuber. The dorsal sepal is gently curved but suddenly curves downward near the tip and is about the same length as the petals. Flowering occurs from October to December.

Taxonomy and naming
Pterostylis wapstrarum was first formally described in 1998 by David Jones from a specimen collected near Pontville. The description was published in Australian Orchid Research, although as the orthographic variant Pterostylis wapstreorum. The specific epithet (wapstrarum) honours Johannes ("Hans") and Annie Wapstra for their assistance to Jones.

Distribution and habitat
The fleshy greenhood grows in grassland and grassy forest near Pontville.

Conservation
Pterostylis wapstrarum  is listed as  "critically endangered" under the Australian Government Environment Protection and Biodiversity Conservation Act 1999 and as "endangered" under the Tasmanian Government Threatened Species Protection Act 1995. The total population of this species is estimated to be fewer than 500 individual plants, none of which is known from a conservation reserve. It is threatened by habitat modification and land clearing, grazing by rabbits, inappropriate fire regimes, weeds, and destruction by the introduced red-legged earth-mite (Halotydeus destructor).

References

wapstrarum
Endemic orchids of Australia
Orchids of Tasmania
Plants described in 1998